Manningtree is a town and civil parish in the Tendring district of Essex, England, which lies on the River Stour. It is part of the Suffolk Coast and Heaths Area of Natural Beauty.

Smallest town claim
Manningtree has traditionally claimed to be the smallest town in England, but its 2007 population of 700 people in 20 hectares and the 2011 census population for the civil parish of 900 are much higher than the 351 population of Fordwich, Kent. However, it is believed to be the smallest town by area. 

In April 2009 it was proposed that Manningtree should merge with Mistley and Lawford to form a single parish, losing its separate identity as a town. As of 2018 such a merger has not occurred.

History

The name Manningtree is thought to derive from 'many trees'.
The town grew around the wool trade from the 15th century until its decline in the 18th century and also had a thriving shipping trade in corn, timber and coal until this declined with the coming of the railway. Manningtree is known as the centre of the activities of Matthew Hopkins, the self-appointed Witchfinder General, who claimed to have overheard local women discussing their meetings with the devil in 1644 with his accusations leading to their execution as witches.

Many of the buildings in the centre of the town have Georgian facades which obscure their earlier origins. Notable buildings include the town's library, which was originally built as 'a public hall for the purposes of corn exchange' and was later used around 1900 for public entertainment, and the oldest Methodist church in Essex, located on South Street.

The Ascension, by John Constable, which now hangs in Dedham church, was commissioned in 1821 for the altarpiece of the early seventeenth century church on the High Street, demolished in 1967.

Governance
Manningtree is part of the electoral ward called Manningtree, Mistley, Little Bentley and Tendring. The population of this ward at the 2011 census was 4,603.

Geography

Manningtree is on Holbrook Bay, part of the River Stour in the north of Essex. It is the eastern edge of Dedham Vale.

Nearby villages include Dedham, Mistley, Lawford, Wrabness and Brantham.

Transport

Manningtree railway station is on the Great Eastern Main Line and provides regular, direct services to London, Norwich and Harwich.

In fiction 
Manningtree features in Ronald Bassett's 1966 novel Witchfinder General and in A.K. Blakemore's 2021 novel The Manningtree Witches.

In Shakespeare’s Henry IV Part I (Act 2 Scene 4), Flastaff is referred to as “that roasted Manningtree ox“. This was marked in 2000 with a sculpture of an ox in the town centre.

A.K. Blakemore's 2021 novel, The Manningtree Witches, is set in the town. The novel won the Desmond Elliott Prize 2021, being described by the judges as "a stunning achievement."

Notable people
Margaret Thatcher lived in Manningtree and worked for BX Plastics
Matthew Hopkins, the self-styled Witch-Finder General, lived in Manningtree

Twin town
 Frankenberg, Hesse, Germany

References

External links

 Manningtree Town Council website

 
Towns in Essex
Civil parishes in Essex
Tendring
Populated coastal places in Essex